Frederic Michel Henry Johais (born September 15, 1980 in Tours, France) is a French racing driver. He has worked in the Las Vegas-based racing school Exotics Racing since 2013.

Racing career
Johais raced in karting from 1991 to 1999, reaching a world-class level in the Karting World Championship in 1999, while he was racing alongside Fernando Alonso, Kimi Räikkönen and Heikki Kovalainen.

In 2000, Johais made his start in auto racing through the Citroën Saxo Cup. Despite a crash at the start of his second race in Nogaro, he was able to get a podium at the end of the season in the Junior category and to finish 11th overall (5th in Junior) and Rookie of the year.

In 2001, Frederic competed in 2 different championships: The Citroen Saxo Cup and the French Formula Renault 2000 Championship, sharing the car with Patrick Pilet. In the Saxo Cup, he finished 3rd overall after winning one race, and picked up the title in the Junior Category. In Formula Renault, he had a rough season with a small budget and saw his best result come forth in Estoril at the Renault International Finals (15th).

In 2002, thanks to Bernard Simmenauer, he moved up to the French FFSA GT Championship with the Porsche 996 GT3 RS in the Mc Donald's Racing Team alongside Jean Louis Miloe. After finishing in the top 5 during the season start, Johais was forced to stop at the middle of the season due to a lack of money. To finish his season, he raced in go kart finishing runner up in the French endurance championship and 2nd at Le Mans 24 hours race.

In 2003, he raced on a Porsche 996 GT3 Cup alongside Thierry Rabineau for Nourry Competition in the French GT3 Championship, finishing 4th overall with four podiums and two pole positions.

In 2004, after losing his main sponsor, he reduced his program and started the season in the French Formula France Championship, winning the first event in Nogaro. He later stopped the season despite leading the championship in points. A few months later, Jacky Foulatier invited him to join the Kart Mag Racing Team to finish the season in the go kart category, finishing 5th at the Le Mans 24 hours race and 3rd at the ROK Cup World Final in Lonato (Italy).

From 2005 to 2007, Johais went back in go kart in the Rotax Max Euro Challenge finishing 7th overall with 2 podiums in UK and Austria. During those years, he also won a new title at the Le Mans 24 Hours, and as well as the 24 hours of Bahrain and 24 hours of Essaouira in Morocco. After a break to work on his professional career through FJ Driving Concept, he came back to the auto racing in 2012 through the NASCAR Whelen Euro Series and win the opening race at Tours Speedway.

Then he moved to the US and raced in Super Late Model, finishing 5th in Las Vegas in 2013, and in the new EXR Series Championship finishing 2nd in COTA (Austin, Texas) in 2016. In 2015, he was also very close to win the SKUSA Supernats in Las Vegas, starting from the first row in the final, but he has been pushed in the barriers at the start.

He is racing in the 2017 GT4 European Series Southern Cup on a BMW M4 for the BMW Team France alongside Julien Piguet, taking back-to-back victories at Magny-Cours in September.

References

French racing drivers
1980 births
Living people
GT4 European Series drivers